Harold en Italie, symphonie avec un alto principal (English: Harold in Italy, symphony with viola obbligato), as the manuscript calls and describes it, is a four-movement orchestral work by Hector Berlioz, his Opus 16, H. 68, written in 1834. Throughout, the unusual viola part represents the titular protagonist, without casting the form as a concerto. The movements have these titles, alluding to a programme: 
1. Harold in the mountains
2. March of the pilgrims
3. Serenade of an Abruzzo mountaineer
4. Orgy of bandits

Creation
The Italian composer Niccolò Paganini encouraged Hector Berlioz to write . The two first met after a concert of Berlioz's works conducted by Narcisse Girard on 22 December 1833, three years after the premiere of Berlioz's Symphonie fantastique. According to Berlioz' Memoires, Paganini had acquired a "superb viola", a Stradivarius (the so-called "Paganini-Mendelssohn" ) — "But I have no suitable music. Would you like to write a solo for viola? You are the only one I can trust for this task." ("") 

Berlioz began "by writing a solo for viola, but one which involved the orchestra in such a way as not to reduce the effectiveness of the orchestral contribution". When Paganini saw the sketch of the allegro movement, with all the rests in the viola part, he told Berlioz it would not do, and that he expected to be playing continuously.  They then parted, with Paganini disappointed.
A few years later, Paganini was in Paris again and attended a concert including the Symphonie Fantastique and Harold en Italie conducted by Berlioz. After the concert Paganini went to see Berlioz and told him he had never been as touched as by Harold, then kneeled and kissed Berlioz’s hand.

Lord Byron's poem Childe Harold's Pilgrimage inspired the mood of Harold. Berlioz wrote, 

That he had recycled some of the material from his discarded concert overture, Rob Roy, went unmentioned. Despite Berlioz' mention of Byron, music critics, such as Donald Tovey have taken pains to point out that Harold in Italy owes nearly nothing to the poem: "no definite elements of Byron's poem have penetrated the impregnable fortress of Berlioz's encyclopaedic inattention,...there is no trace in Berlioz's music of any of the famous passages of Childe Harold."

Form

From a formal point of view, the work can be regarded as a symphony. For example, it has four movements, the third of which is a Beethovenesque scherzo. The solo parts never have a virtuoso style comparable to other solo concertos. The viola has its most important role in the first movement, where it introduces the Harold theme as well as the two secondary themes.

In addition to the solo viola, the work calls for 2 flutes (2nd doubling piccolo), 2 oboes (1st doubling cor anglais in movement III), 2 clarinets in C (movements I, III, and IV) and A (movement II), 4 bassoons, 4 horns, 2 cornets, 2 trumpets, 3 trombones, tuba, timpani, cymbals, triangle, 2 tambourines, harp and strings.

Throughout the work the viola represents Harold. The first movement, Harold aux montagnes, traces scenes his melancholic character encounters in the mountains. The manner in which the viola theme hesitantly repeats its opening phrase — gaining confidence, like an idea forming, before the long melody spills out in its entirety — was satirized in a musical paper after the premiere: "Ha! ha! ha! – haro! haro! Harold!" it began, a cheeky touch Berlioz recalled years later in his Mémoires. In the second movement, Marche des pèlerins, Harold accompanies a group of pilgrims; in the third, Sérénade, his mistress is enchanted by music. The last movement, Orgie de brigands, finds the hero spiritually drained and in wild company, perhaps in a tavern. (Jacques Barzun reminds us: "The brigand of Berlioz's time is the avenger of social injustice, the rebel against the city, who resorts to nature for healing the wounds of social man.")

History
Harold in Italy was premiered on 23 November 1834 with the Orchestre de la Société des Concerts du Conservatoire, Chrétien Urhan playing the viola part, Narcisse Girard conducting. Even though the second movement "March of the Pilgrims" received an encore, this performance contributed to Berlioz's decision to conduct his own music in the future.

Paganini did not hear the work he had commissioned until 16 December 1838; then he was so overwhelmed by it that, following the performance, he dragged Berlioz onto the stage and there knelt and kissed his hand before a wildly cheering audience and applauding musicians. A few days later he sent Berlioz a letter of congratulations, enclosing a bank draft for 20,000 francs.

Franz Liszt prepared a piano transcription (with viola accompaniment) of the work in 1836 (S.472).

Notable performances
 1842, 1 February, Paris, Salle Vivienne – Jean-Delphin Alard (soloist); Berlioz (conductor)
 1842, 26 September, Brussels – Heinrich Wilhelm Ernst (soloist); Berlioz (conductor)
 1847, 5 May, Saint Petersburg premiere – Heinrich Wilhelm Ernst (soloist); Berlioz (conductor)
 1848, 7 February, London premiere – Henry Hill (1808–1846) (soloist); Berlioz (conductor); Drury Lane Theatre
 1853, 22 November, Bremen – Joseph Joachim (soloist); Berlioz (conductor)
 1853, 1 December, Leipzig – Ferdinand David (soloist); Berlioz (conductor); Gewandhaus Orchestra
 1868, 11 January, Moscow – Ferdinand Laub (soloist); Berlioz (conductor); Moscow Conservatory Orchestra
 1868, 8 February, Saint Petersburg – Hieronymus Weickmann (soloist); Berlioz (conductor); final performance under the direction of the composer
 1937, 4 February – Lionel Tertis (soloist, his last public performance); Ernest Ansermet; BBC Symphony Orchestra

The first studio recording was made by RCA in 1944 with William Primrose and the Boston Symphony Orchestra conducted by Serge Koussevitzky.

The piece was used in Terrence Malick's 2013 film To The Wonder, starring Ben Affleck and Olga Kurylenko. The film has several visual references to the composition's content and history.

Recordings
Harold en Italie has been frequently recorded.
 William Primrose, NBC Symphony Orchestra, Arturo Toscanini, January 2, 1939 live broadcast
 William Primrose, Boston Symphony Orchestra, Serge Koussevitzky, 1944
 Gunther Breitenbach, Vienna Symphony, Rudolf Moralt, 1950
 William Primrose, Royal Philharmonic Orchestra, Thomas Beecham, 1952
 Carlton Cooley, NBC Symphony Orchestra, Arturo Toscanini, 1953
 Frederick Riddle, London Philharmonic Orchestra, Hermann Scherchen, 1953
 Joseph de Pasquale, Boston Symphony Orchestra, Charles Munch, 1954
 Ladisla Cerny, Czech Philharmonic, Vaclav Jiracek, 1955
 Frederick Riddle, Royal Philharmonic Orchestra, Sir Thomas Beecham, 1956
 Heinz Kirchner, Berlin Philharmonic, Igor Markevitch, 1957
 William Primrose, Boston Symphony Orchestra, Charles Munch, 1958
 William Lincer, New York Philharmonic, Leonard Bernstein, 1961
 Yehudi Menuhin, Philharmonia Orchestra, Colin Davis, 1963
 Klaas Boon, Royal Concertgebouw Orchestra, Pierre Monteux, 1963
 Georg Schmid, Bavarian Radio Symphony Orchestra, Rafael Kubelík, 1964
 Rudolf Barshai, Moscow Philharmonic Orchestra, David Oistrakh, 1964
 Walter Trampler, London Symphony Orchestra, Georges Prêtre, 1969
 Joseph de Pasquale, Philadelphia Orchestra, Eugene Ormandy, 1970
 Claude Ducrocq, Orchestre philharmonique de Strasbourg, Alain Lombard, 1974
 Nobuko Imai, London Symphony Orchestra, Colin Davis, 1975
 Daniel Benyamini, Israel Philharmonic Orchestra, Zubin Mehta, 1975
 Joseph Suk, Czech Philharmonic, Dietrich Fischer-Dieskau, 1976
 Donald McInnes, Orchestre National de France, Leonard Bernstein, 1977
 Pinchas Zukerman, Orchestre de Paris, Daniel Barenboim, 1977
 Robert Vernon, Cleveland Orchestra, Lorin Maazel, 1977
 Yuri Bashmet, USSR State Radio and Television Symphony Orchestra, Vladimir Fedoseyev, 1981
 Lubomir Jaly, Czech Philharmonic, František Jílek, 1981
 Milan Telecky, Slovak Radio Symphony Orchestra, Onderj Lenard, 1982
 Wolfram Christ, Berlin Philharmonic, Lorin Maazel, 1985
 Douglas McNabney, Orchestre Symphonique de Québec, Simon Streatfield, 1985
 Pinchas Zukerman, Montreal Symphony Orchestra, Charles Dutoit, 1988
 Yuri Bashmet, Frankfurt Radio Symphony Orchestra, Eliahu Inbal, 1989
 Gérard Caussé, Orchestre du Capitole de Toulouse, Michel Plasson, 1991
 Gérard Caussé, Orchestre Révolutionnaire et Romantique, John Eliot Gardiner, 1994
 Laurent Verney, Orchestre de l'Opéra Bastille, Myung-whun Chung, 1996
 Bruno Pasquier, Orchestre Philharmonique Regional Montpellier, Cyril Diederich, 1996
 Bruno Giuranna, BBC Symphony Orchestra, Maxim Shostakovich, 1996
 Rivka Golani, San Diego Symphony, Yoav Talmi, 1996
 Gérard Caussé, Orchestra del Teatro La Fenice, Jean Fournet, 1997
 Mikhail Tolpygo, USSR State Academic Symphony Orchestra, David Oistrakh, 1997
 Csaba Erdélyi, New Zealand Symphony Orchestra, Marc Taddei, 2001
 Tabea Zimmermann, London Symphony Orchestra, Colin Davis, 2003
 Naoko Shimizu, Sendai Philharmonic Orchestra, Kazuhiro Koizumi, 2007
 Jean-Eric Soucy, Southwest German Radio Symphony Orchestra, Sylvain Cambreling, 2009
 Antoine Tamestit, Les Musiciens du Louvre, Marc Minkowski, 2011
 Stefano Passaggio, Zagreb Philharmonic Orchestra, Milan Horvat, 2011
 David Aaron Carpenter, Helsinki Philharmonic Orchestra, Vladimir Ashkenazy, 2011
 James Ehnes, Melbourne Symphony Orchestra, Sir Andrew Davis, 2014
 Antoine Tamestit, hr-Sinfonieorchester, Eliahu Inbal, 2018 
 Timothy Ridout, Orchestre Philarmonique de Strasbourg, conducted by John Nelson  CD Erato 2022

References

Bibliography
 Berlioz, Hector. Memoirs. ch. 45
 Berlioz website: Harold in Italy
 Stolba, K. Marie. The Development of Western Music: A History. The McGraw-Hill Companies, Inc.; New York, New York; 1998.
 program notes, 2005 by Richard Freed
 D. Kern Holoman, program notes, 1996

Further reading
 Sir Donald Tovey, essay on Harold in Italy in Essays in Musical Analysis, vol. IV

External links
 
 BBC Discovering Music (page down for link to .ram file discussing the work)
 Viola-in-Music.com – Harold in Italy

Compositions by Hector Berlioz
Romantic symphonies
Compositions for viola and orchestra
1834 compositions
Concertante symphonies
Musical settings of poems by Lord Byron